Zhinu is a genus of spiders in the family Tetragnathidae.

Species
, the World Spider Catalog accepted the following extant species:
Zhinu manmiaoyangi Kallal & Hormiga, 2018 (type species) – Taiwan
Zhinu reticuloides (Yaginuma, 1958) – Korea, Japan

References

Tetragnathidae
Araneomorphae genera